Ola D. Gløtvold (born 1 June 1949 in Engerdal) is a Norwegian politician for the Centre Party.

He was elected to the Norwegian Parliament from Hedmark in 1993, and was re-elected on two occasions. He had previously served in the position of deputy representative during the term 1973–1977.

Gløtvold held various position in Engerdal municipality council from 1971 to 1991, serving as mayor in 1987–1991. From 1975 to 1993 he was also involved in Hedmark county council.

References

1949 births
Living people
People from Engerdal
Members of the Storting
Centre Party (Norway) politicians
21st-century Norwegian politicians
20th-century Norwegian politicians